Microfinance Focus is an English-language microfinance international online news media and publication company based in Bangalore, India. Started in July 2006, Microfinance Focus publishes news and articles daily and is considered as a resource centre for the microfinance sector globally. Vikash is the founder of Microfinance Focus. Microfinance Focus has also been conferred "Microfinance Community Knowledge Promoter Award 2007 for Outstanding Community Support"  by Solution Exchange (a wing of UN, India) in the year 2007.

Activities
Microfinance Focus was set up to provide a daily news source and analysis on microfinance current affairs. The publication provides daily news, interviews, analysis and reports on the microfinance sector. The website is Microfinance Focus's main platform for communication. It publishes news about the sector on a daily basis, under topics ranging from outlook of social investment, to risk management, to microinsurance, to incorporation of information systems ICT or MIS in NGOs, mobile banking, loan repayment and liquidity crisis. The online publication has also interviewed several Microfinance leaders including Muhammad Yunus, Princess Maxima, Vikram Akula, Sam Daley Harris, John Hatch, and Nachiket Mor.

Media coverage and citations 
Several Microfinance Focus articles have been cited by international media and blogs including IBtimes, Huffington post, The Washington Post, Guardian, Devex, Wall Street Journal, CGDEV, and Yesmagazine.

Articles of Microfinance Focus have also been cited in many research papers such as COMMERCIAL MICROFINANCE AND SOCIAL RESPONSIBILITY: A CRITIQUE , DFID - Social health insurance Protocol, and USAID-A Guarantee to Root Capital Report.

References

External links

Microfinance
Poverty activism